Annona conica is a species of plant in the Annonaceae family. It is endemic to Ecuador.  Its natural habitats are subtropical or tropical dry forests and subtropical or tropical moist lowland forests. It is threatened by habitat loss. The maximum average height for a domesticated Annona Conica is around 300 cm and in the wild 500 cm.

Description

References

conica
Endemic flora of Ecuador
Endangered plants
Taxonomy articles created by Polbot